Hopewell Center is an unincorporated community in York County, Pennsylvania, United States. It lies at an elevation of 689 feet (210 m).

References

Unincorporated communities in York County, Pennsylvania
Unincorporated communities in Pennsylvania